US or Us most often refers to:

 We (pronoun), in its object case form, spelled as “us”
 An abbreviation for the United States

US, U.S., Us, us, or u.s. may also refer to:

Arts and entertainment

Albums
 Us (Brother Ali album) or the title song, 2009
 Us (Empress Of album), 2018
 Us (Mull Historical Society album), 2003
 Us (Peter Gabriel album), 1992
 Us (EP), by Moon Jong-up, 2021
 Us, by Maceo Parker, 1974
 Us, mini-album by Peakboy, 2019

Songs
 "Us" (James Bay song), 2018
 "Us" (Jennifer Lopez song), 2018
 "Us" (Regina Spektor song), 2004
 "Us", by Azealia Banks from Fantasea, 2012
 "Us", by Celine Dion from Let's Talk About Love, 1997
 "Us", by Gucci Mane from Delusions of Grandeur, 2019
 "Us", by Spoon from Hot Thoughts, 2017

Other media
 US Festival, two 1980s California music festivals organized by Steve Wozniak
 Us (1991 film), a television film
 Us (2019 film), a horror film by Jordan Peele
 Us (novel), a 2014 novel by David Nicholls
 Us (British TV series), a BBC One four-part television comedy series based on the 2014 novel (aired in 2020)
 US (play), a 1966 play by Peter Brook
 "Us" (The Walking Dead), the 50th episode of the television series The Walking Dead: season 4, episode 15 (of 16)
 Us Weekly, an American celebrity magazine

Schools
 University of Salzburg, a university in Austria
 University of Seville, a university in Spain
 , a university in Canada
 University of Szczecin, a university in Poland
 University School, a private all-boys day school in Hunting Valley, Ohio, US

Businesses and organizations
 US Airways (IATA designator US)
 US Organization, a Black nationalist group in the United States founded in 1965
 United Services Club or US Club, a golf club in Mumbai
 United Society, an Anglican charitable organization first founded in 1701
 United Synagogue, the union of British Orthodox synagogues founded in 1870
 , an ambulance company in Montreal, Canada
 Uniwide Sales, a now-defunct retail operator

Other uses 
 .us, Internet top-level domain for the United States
 Us, Val-d'Oise, France
 Ultrasound or ultrasonic
 Understudy, in theatre
 Union State, a politico-economic union consisting of the Russian Federation and the Republic of Belarus
 United States Reports, in legal citations
 United States Supreme Court, in legal citations
 Upper Silesia
 Uranium monosulfide
 , Latin for "as above"

See also 
 Microsecond (μs)
 United States (disambiguation)
 Uz (disambiguation)
 SU (disambiguation)